Frank Anderson Shrontz (born December 14, 1931) is an American corporate executive and former government official. He is the former CEO and chairman of the Boeing Company.

Early life 
Born and raised in Boise, Idaho, Shrontz was the son of sporting goods merchant. He graduated from Boise High School in 1949 and the University of Idaho in Moscow in 1954 with a Bachelor of Laws degree. While at Idaho he served as chapter president of Beta Theta Pi fraternity. Following a commission and service in the U.S. Army from 1954–1956, he attended the Harvard Business School where he received an MBA in 1958 and then joined Boeing.

Career 
Beginning in 1973, Schrontz served in the Nixon and Ford administrations at the Department of Defense, and returned to Boeing in January 1977 as a vice president in charge of contract administration and planning. He later became a division head managing production of 707, 727, and 737 aircraft. During the oil crisis of the 1970's he was a proponent of the mid-range 737 jetliner rather than the longer range and more fuel efficient 757 and 767. This was a successful decision, as stabilizing oil prices and airline deregulation soon led the 737 to become Boeing's top selling airframe. 

He became president of Boeing in 1984, and served as CEO from 1986–1996. He was chairman of the board from 1988 to 1997.

Schrontz has served on the board of 3M, Boise Cascade Corporation, and Chevron, and as a citizen regent on the Smithsonian Institution's Board of Regents. He is part of the Seattle Mariners ownership group and is a member on the team's board of directors.

While serving on the board of directors for Chevron, a new double-hulled supertanker was named in his honor in November 1998. The South Korean-built ship was renamed the Antares Voyager in 2003 after a change of ownership.

Personal life 
Schrontz married Harriet Ann Houghton, who he met at Idaho, in 1954. The had three sons, and were married for 58 years. Shrontz was inducted into the Junior Achievement U.S. Business Hall of Fame in 2004. Boeing endowed the Frank Schrontz Endowed Chair of Professional Ethics at Seattle University beginning in 1997. He was awarded the Oxford Cup, Beta Theta Pi's most prestigious award, in 1999.

References

External links
 Boeing.com - Frank Shrontz
 UI Alumni Assoc. Hall of Fame - Frank Shrontz - inducted 1986
 Boise High School Hall of Fame - Frank Shrontz 
Beta Theta Pi.org - Frank A. Shrontz
 Fred Hutchinson Cancer Research Center - Frank Shrontz
 DOD Key Officials History (1947-2014)

University of Idaho alumni
People from Boise, Idaho
1931 births
Living people
American people of German descent
Harvard Business School alumni
American chairpersons of corporations
Chairmen of Boeing
University of Idaho College of Law alumni
 United States Army officers